Uptown Station is an intermodal transportation center in Normal, Illinois, United States. It is served by Amtrak, the national railroad passenger system, and is the major intercity rail station in north-central Illinois. It appears on Amtrak timetables as Bloomington–Normal. 

Amtrak runs two routes through the station–the Lincoln Service and the Texas Eagle. This was also a stop for the Ann Rutledge until April 2007. Amtrak Thruway motorcoach routes serve the station via Davenport, Galesburg, Peoria, Champaign/Urbana, and Indianapolis.

In 2014, 261,631 train passengers boarded or alighted from Amtrak trains at Uptown Station, making it the fourth busiest Amtrak station in the Midwest behind Chicago, Milwaukee, and St. Louis. This is primarily due to the large number of passengers traveling to and from Chicago and St. Louis.

Former facilities

Union Depot
The original station serving Bloomington-Normal was Bloomington Union Depot. This station was located on Bloomington's west side, just south of West Washington Street and on the west side of the Chicago & Alton Railroad tracks. It had been constructed in the mid-1880s, and survived well into the Amtrak era because Bloomington-Normal is located along the most direct route from Chicago to St. Louis. The station was closed on June 10, 1990 to be replaced by a much smaller facility in Normal. Seven years later, on October 31, 1997, a then-partially demolished Union Station was destroyed by fire.

1990 Amtrak facility
The original Normal station was built to the specifications of the Amtrak Standard Stations Program. Located near the campus of Illinois State University, this station lasted until the new facility opened in 2012.

New facility

On August 7, 2010, construction began on a new intermodal facility, located across the tracks from the 1990 facility. The new facility includes administrative offices and council chambers for the town in addition to serving Amtrak, city and long-distance buses. The facility opened on June 14, 2012. Construction, which cost between $43 and $47 million, was funded by a combination of federal, state and local grants.

The new   transportation center was designed by Ratio Architects of Champaign; it is composed primarily of red brick with limestone trim. The building's prominent corner clock tower has become a landmark for the neighborhood. Numerous environmentally sustainable features are also included, such as a green roof partially planted in vegetation that will absorb rainwater and cool the building; the rest of the roof is covered in reflective materials to deflect sunlight.

Connections
Bus transportation providers are:

Burlington Trailways between Indianapolis, IN and Burlington, IA
Connect Transit regular routes A, B, D, E, G, H, I, and Nite Ride and Redbird Express serving Illinois State University.
Peoria Charter: Peoria – O'Hare/Midway

References

External links

Bloomington-Normal, IL – Texas Eagle (Amtrak)
Bloomington-Normal Amtrak Station (USA Rail Guide – Train Web)
Uptown Normal Webcam of Multimodal Station Construction (Normal.org)

Amtrak stations in Illinois
Buildings and structures in Bloomington–Normal
Transportation buildings and structures in McLean County, Illinois
Railway stations in the United States opened in 1990
1990 establishments in Illinois